France 3 Alpes is one France 3's regional broadcasting services to people in the Rhône-Alpes region. It was launched as ORTF Rhône-Alpes in 1968. It is headquartered in La Tronche.
The service is also one of 2 services to be broadcast to people living in the region, the other being France 3 Rhône-Alpes, which is broadcast from Lyon. France 3 Alpes also produces news content. It is also received in Switzerland.

Presenters
 Delphine Aldebert
 Jean-Christophe Solari

Programming
 19/20 Alpes
 19/20 Grenoble
 Soir 3 Alpes
 12/13 Alpes
 La voix est libre
 Midi Pile
 Alpes Express

References

External links 
 Official site 

03 Alpes
Television channels and stations established in 1968
Mass media in Grenoble